Costanzo Preve (14 April 1943 – 23 November 2013) was an Italian philosopher and a political theoretician.

Preve is widely considered one of the most important anti-capitalist European thinkers and a renowned expert in the history of Marxism. His thought is based on the Ancient Greek and idealistic tradition philosophy under the influence of Johann Gottlieb Fichte, Georg Wilhelm Friedrich Hegel and Karl Marx. He is author of many essays and volumes about philosophical interpretation, communitariansm and universalism.

Biography 
Born in Valenza, Preve studied philosophy, political science and ancient and modern Greek in Turin, Paris and Athens. He worked as a high school teacher from 1967 to 2002 and was engaged first in the Italian Communist Party (PCI). He then got close to Proletarian Democracy, a party created in 1975 which opposed to the historic compromise between the PCI and the Christian Democracy. After the dissolving of the PCI following the 1989 fall of the Berlin Wall, Preve undertook a critical review of his own positions held in the precedent decades. He gave lectures for and took part in some of the cultural activities of the Anti-Imperialist Camp, a union of international leftist anti-imperialist activists who have received much attention from the media because of their critical stand against American imperialism and Zionism. Since 2005, he wrote for geopolitical journal Eurasia.

Preve was initially influenced by Marxist philosopher Louis Althusser before turning himself towards Georg Lukács. He rejected the important workerism current (or autonomist Marxism) during the 1960–1970s. In the 1990s, Preve returned to Althusser and criticized economism and orthodox Marxism based on a teleological philosophy of history inspired by Hegel. As did Althusser in his latter work on "random materialism" (matérialisme aléatoire), Preve insisted on the place of contingency in history and considers the class contrast between the bourgeoisie and the proletariat to be a historical passing form specific to a certain period of the capitalist mode of production. Preve conceived of the 1960s as a rupture in history in much the same way that the appearance of the proletariat in the 19th century had been as capitalism entered a new phase. However, Preve insists against Althusser on the young Marx's theory of alienation and on his theory on human nature and provocatively considered Marxism as the last phase of German idealism. Preve has also insisted on the unprecedented power of the sole hyperpower, that is the United States, warning against cultural imperialism. He criticized Antonio Negri and Michael Hardt's Empire (2000).

Preve assigned four masters to Marx, namely Epicurus (to whom he dedicated his thesis, Difference of natural philosophy between Democritus and Epicurus, 1841) for his materialism and theory of clinamen; Jean-Jacques Rousseau, from which come his idea of egalitarian democracy; Adam Smith, from whom came the idea that the grounds of property is labour; and finally Georg Wilhelm Friedrich Hegel.

Preve was an atheist. On 23 November 2013, Preve died in Turin, where he lived.

Works 
 La classe operaia non va in paradiso: dal marxismo occidentale all'operaismo italiano (in AA.VV., Alla ricerca della produzione perduta). 1982, Dedalo
 Cosa possiamo chiedere al marxismo (in AA.VV., Il marxismo in mare aperto). 1983, Franco Angeli
 La filosofia imperfetta. Una proposta di ricostruzione del marxismo contemporaneo. 1984, Franco Angeli
 La teoria in pezzi. La dissoluzione del paradigma teorico operaista in Italia (1976–1983). 1984, Dedalo
 La ricostruzione del marxismo fra filosofia e scienza (in AA.VV., La cognizione della crisi. Saggi sul marxismo di Louis Althusser). 1986, Franco Angeli
 Vers une nouvelle alliance. Actualité et possibilités de développement de l'effort ontologique de Bloch et de Lukàcs (in AA.VV. Ernst Bloch et György Lukács. Un siècle après). 1986, Actes Sud  [Verdinglichung und Utopie. 1987, Sendler]
 La rivoluzione teorica di Louis Althusser (in AA.VV., Il marxismo di Louis Althusser). 1987, Vallerini Editore
 Viewing Lukàcs from the 1980s. 1987, The University of Chicago Press
 La passione durevole. 1989, Vangelista
 La musa di Clio vestita di rosso (in AA.VV., Trasfromazione e persistenza. Saggi sulla storicità del capitalismo). 1990, Franco Angeli
 Il filo di Arianna. Quindici lezioni di filosofia marxista. 1990, Vangelista
 Il marxismo ed il problema teorico dell'eguaglianza oggi (in AA.VV., Egalite/Inegalite). 1990, QuattroVenti
 Il convitato di pietra. 1991, Vangelista
 L'assalto al cielo. Saggio su marxismo e individualismo. 1992, Vangelista
 Il pianeta rosso. Saggio su marxismo e universalismo. 1992, Vangelista
 L'ideologia Italiana. Saggio sulla storia delle idee marxiste in Italia. 1993, Vangelista
 The dream and the reality. The spiritual crisis of western Marxism (in AA.VV., Marxism and spirituality. An international anthology). 1993, Bengin and Gavey
 Il tempo della ricerca. Saggio sul moderno, il postmoderno e la fine della storia. 1993, Vangelista
 Louis Althusser. La lutte contre le sens commun dans le mouvement communiste "historique" au XX siècle (in AA.VV, Politique et philosophie dans l'œuvre de Louis Althusser). 1993, Presses Universitaires de France
 L'eguale libertà. Saggio sulla natura umana. 1994, Vangelista
 Oltre la gabbia d'acciaio. 1994, Vangelista, (+ Gianfranco La Grassa)
 Il teatro dell'assurdo (cronaca e storia dei recenti avvenimenti italiani), 1995, Punto rosso, (+ Gianfranco La Grassa)
 Una teoria nuova per una diversa strategia politica, 1995, Punto rosso, (+ Gianfranco La Grassa)
 Un elogio della filosofia. 1996, Punto Rosso
 La fine di una teoria. Il collasso del marxismo storico del Novecento. 1996, Unicopli, (+ Gianfranco La Grassa)
 Il comunismo storico novecentesco (1917–1991). 1997, Punto Rosso
 Nichilismo Verità Storia. Un manifesto filosofico della fine del XX secolo. 1997, CRT, (+ Massimo Bontempelli)
 Gesù uomo nella storia, Dio nel pensiero. 1997, CRT, (+ Massimo Bontempelli)
 Il crepuscolo della profezia comunista. A 150 anni dal "Manifesto". 1998, CRT
 L'alba del Sessantotto. Una interpretazione filosofica. 1998, CRT
 Marxismo, Filosofia, Verità. 1998, CRT
 Destra e sinistra. La natura inservibile di due categorie tradizionali. 1998, CRT
 La questione nazionale alle soglie del XXI secolo. 1998, CRT
 Le stagioni del nichilismo. Un'analisi filosofica ed una prognosi storica. 1998, CRT
 Individui liberati, comunità solidali. Sulla questione della società degli individui. 1998, CRT
 Contro il capitalismo, oltre il comunismo. Riflessioni su di una eredità storica e su un futuro possible. 1998, CRT
 La fine dell'Urss. Dalla transizione mancata alla dissoluzione reale.  1999, CRT
 Il ritorno del clero. La questione degli intellettuali oggi. 1999, CRT
 Le avventure dell'ateismo. Religione e materialismo oggi. 1999, CRT
 Un nuovo manifesto filosofico. Prospettive inedite e orizzonti convincenti per il pensiero. 1999, CRT, (+ Andrea Cavazzini)
 Hegel Marx Heidegger. Un percorso nella filosofia contemporanea. 1999, CRT
 Scienza, politica, filosofia. Un'interpretazione filosofica del Novecento. 1999, CRT
 I secoli difficili. Introduzione al pensiero filosofico dell'Ottocento e del Novecento. 1999, CRT
 L'educazione filosofica. Memoria del passato - Compito del presente - Sfida del futuro.  2000, CRT
 Il bombardamento etico. Saggio sull'interventismo umanitario, l'embargo terapeutico e la menzogna evidente. 2000, CRT
 Marxismo e filosofia. Note, riflessioni e alcune novità. 2002, CRT
 Un secolo di marxismo. Idee e ideologie. 2003, CRT
 Le contraddizioni di Norberto Bobbio. Per una critica del bobbianesimo cerimoniale. 2004, CRT
 Marx inattuale. Eredità e prospettiva. 2004, Bollati Boringhieri
 Verità filosofica e critica sociale. Religione, filosofia, marxismo. 2004, CRT
 Dove va la destra? Dove va la sinistra? (+ Giano Accame).  2004, Edizioni Settimo Sigillo
 Comunitarismo Filosofia Politica. 2004, Noctua
 L'ideocrazia imperiale americana. 2004, Edizioni Settimo Sigillo
 Filosofia del presente. 2004, Edizioni Settimo Sigillo
 Filosofia e Geopolitica. 2005, Edizioni all'insegna del Veltro, (introduction by Tiberio Graziani)
 Del buon uso dell'universalismo.  2005, Edizioni Settimo Sigillo, (introduction by Carlo Gambescia)
 Dialoghi sul presente. Alienazione, globalizzazione, Destra/Sinistra, atei devoti. Per un pensiero ribelle (+ Alain de Benoist and Giuseppe Giaccio). 2005 Controcorrente
 Marx e gli antichi greci. 2005, Petite Plaisance, (+Luca Grecchi)
 Il popolo al potere. Il problema della democrazia nei suoi aspetti storici e filosofici. 2006, Arianna Editrice, (introduction by Giuseppe Giaccio)
 Verità e relativismo. Religione, scienza, filosofia e politica nell'epoca della globalizzazione. 2006, Alpina (introduction by Franco Cardini)
 Elogio del comunitarismo. 2006, Controcorrente
 Il paradosso De Benoist. 2006, Edizioni Settimo Sigillo, (introduction by Carlo Gambescia)
 Storia della dialettica. 2006, Petite Plaisance
 Storia critica del marxismo. 2007, Edizioni Città del Sole, (introduction by André Tosel)
 Storia dell'etica. 2007, Petite Plaisance
 Hegel antiutilitarista. 2007, Edizioni Settimo Sigillo, (introduction by Carlo Gambescia)
 Storia del Materialismo. 2007, Petite Plaisance
 Una approssimazione al pensiero di Karl Marx. Tra materialismo e idealismo. 2007, Il Prato (introduction by Diego Fusaro)
 Ripensare Marx. Filosofia, Idealismo, Materialismo. 2007, Editrice Ermes
 Un trotzkismo capitalistico? Ipotesi sociologico-religiosa dei Neocons americani e dei loro seguaci europei (in AA.VV., Neocons. L'ideologia neoconservatrice e le sfide della storia). 2007, Il Cerchio
 Alla ricerca della speranza perduta. 2008, Settimo Sigillo, (+ Luigi Tedeschi)
 La quarta guerra mondiale. 2008, Edizioni all'insegna del Veltro
 Il marxismo e la tradizione culturale europea, 2009, Petite Plaisance
 Nuovi signori e nuovi sudditi. Ipotesi sulla struttura di classe del capitalismo contemporaneo, 2010, Petite Plaisance (with Eugenio Orso)
 Logica della storia e comunismo novecentesco. L'effetto di sdoppiamento, 2010, Petite Plaisance (with Roberto Sidoli)
 Filosofia della verità e della giustizia. Il pensiero di Karel Kosík, 2012, Petite Plaisance (with Linda Cesana)
 Lettera sull'umanesimo, 2012, Petite Plaisance
 Una nuova storia alternativa della filosofia. Il cammino ontologico-sociale della filosofia, 2013, Pistoia, Petite Plaisance.

Notes

References 
 Norberto Bobbio, Ideological Profile of twentieth-Century Italy, Princeton University Press, Princeton, New Jersey, 1995 (p. 198).
 Étienne Balibar, La filosofia di Marx, Manifestolibri, 1994 (p. 15).
 Norberto Bobbio, Né con Marx né contro Marx, Editori Riuniti, Rome, 1997 (pp. 223–240).
 André Tosel,  Devenir du marxisme: de la fin du marxisme-léninisme aux mille marxismes, France-Italie 1975-1995, in Bidet, Jacques Bidet - Kouvélakis, Eustache,Dictionnaire Marx contemporain, PUF, Paris 2001, (p. 72 ff.).
 Cristina Corradi, Storia dei marxismi in Italia, Manifestolibri, Rome, 2005 (pp. 278–294).

External links 
 C. Preve,The "limitless horizon" of capitalism (Interview by Claudio Gallo) 
 Eleven Questions for Costanzo Preve from Robert Dannin 
 (5)The Dream and the Reality: The Spiritual Crisis of Western Marxism (Text by C.Preve from Marxism and Spirituality: An International Anthology) 
 Texts by Costanzo Preve 
 Alain de Benoist interviews Costanzo Preve (Élements, n. 115) 
 Alain de Benoist interviews Costanzo Preve (Élements, n. 116) 

20th-century Italian philosophers
21st-century Italian philosophers
Atheist philosophers
Communitarianism
Italian anti-capitalists
Italian atheists
Marxist theorists
1943 births
2013 deaths
People from Valenza
Universalists